Center for Civil Liberties may refer to:

Center for Civil Liberties (human rights organization)
Center for Civil Liberties (think tank)